
Year 829 (DCCCXXIX) was a common year starting on Friday (link will display the full calendar) of the Julian calendar.

Events 
 By place 

 Byzantine Empire 
 October 2 – Emperor Michael II dies after an 8-year reign in Constantinople, and is succeeded by his 16-year-old son Theophilos, as sole emperor of the Byzantine Empire. He continues his father's ideology of iconoclasm.
 October – Battle of Thasos: Saracens from the newly founded Emirate of Crete almost annihilate the Byzantine fleet at Thasos, close to the coast of Thrace. The Cyclades and other islands in the Aegean Sea are pillaged.

 Europe 
 Emperor Louis the Pious appoints his 6-year-old son Charles (by his second wife Judith) as ruler of the Frankish subkingdom Alamannia, enraging his eldest son and co-emperor Lothair I, who begins an insurrection. 
 Viking chieftain Halfdan the Black becomes king of Agder (modern Norway). He expands his realm through military conquest and political negotiations, dividing the kingdom of Vestfold with his half-brother Olaf.
 Giustiniano Participazio, doge of Venice, dies after a 2-year reign, and is succeeded by his younger brother Giovanni Participazio. He continues the work of Giustiniano, in construction of St. Mark's Basilica.

 Britain 
 King Egbert of Wessex invades Mercia, ousts his rival Wiglaf, and attempts to rule directly from Wessex. He is recognized as overlord (bretwalda) of other English kingdoms. 
 Winter – Battle of the River Dore: Egbert of Wessex leads his army against the Northumbrians as far as Dore, where he clashes with King Eanred of Northumbria.

 Egypt 
 The Nile River freezes over.

 China 
 The Bai kingdom of Nanzhao captures the city of Chengdu, in Sichuan Province.

 By topic 

 Religion 
 Ansgar, Frankish abbot of Corvey (modern Westphalia), is appointed missionary to Sweden by Louis the Pious, at the request of the Swedish king Björn at Haugi.
 The city of Wiesbaden (Germany) is first mentioned by Einhard, biographer of former emperor Charlemagne (approximate date).

Births 
 September 8 – Ali al-Hadi, 10th Shia Imam (approximate date)
 Al-Nasa'i, Muslim scholar and hadith compiler (approximate date)
 Lu Yan, chancellor of the Tang Dynasty (d. 874)
 Yahya I, Muslim sultan (d. 864)

Deaths 
 June 1 – Li Tongjie, general of the Tang Dynasty
 July 30 – Shi Xiancheng, general of the Tang Dynasty
 October 2 – Michael II, emperor of the Byzantine Empire (b. 770)
 Abu al-Razi Muhammad, Muslim governor
 Cináed mac Mugróin, king of Uí Failghe
 Cui Zhi, chancellor of the Tang Dynasty (b. 772)
 Giustiniano Participazio, doge of Venice
 Leibulf of Provence, Frankish nobleman
 Li Yi, Chinese poet (or 827)
 Li You, general of the Tang Dynasty
 Muiredach mac Ruadrach, king of Leinster
 'Umayr ibn al-Walid, Muslim governor
 Wei Chuhou, chancellor of the Tang Dynasty (b. 773)
 Zheng Yin, chancellor of the Tang Dynasty (b. 752)

References